Frederick Henry Hulford (6 February 1883 – 23 January 1976) was a British track and field athlete who competed in the 1912 Summer Olympics. In 1912 he was eliminated in the semi-finals of the 800 metres competition. In the 1500 metres event he was eliminated in the first round.

References

External links
profile

1883 births
1976 deaths
British male middle-distance runners
Olympic athletes of Great Britain
Athletes (track and field) at the 1912 Summer Olympics